C. S. Lewis's highly successful children's book series The Chronicles of Narnia, published from 1950 to 1956, has been adapted several times for radio, television, the stage, and film. The following is a table showing the characters of The Chronicles of Narnia and the actors who have portrayed them.

List

See also
List of The Chronicles of Narnia characters
Adaptations of The Chronicles of Narnia
The Chronicles of Narnia (TV series)

References

External links
Focus on the Family Radio Theatre's page for The Chronicles of Narnia
Amazon.com page for the BBC Radio 4 adaptation

+ actors

Narnia